Saint-Bruno-de-Guigues Aerodrome  is located  north of Saint-Bruno-de-Guigues, Quebec, Canada.

References

Registered aerodromes in Abitibi-Témiscamingue